Saint Helena passports are issued to St Helenians, a unique status recognised by the Government of St Helena, and gained through birth, descent, or application. Those holding this status are British Overseas Territories Citizens connected to Saint Helena, formerly known as British Dependent Territories Citizens.

Types
Since 2014 St Helena passports have been biometric, and are therefore printed in the United Kingdom, where appropriate production facilities exist. However, the St Helena passport office has retained facilities to print non-biometric passports, and does so in cases of emergency (notably urgent travel requirements for medical reasons), owing to the time delay in requesting production of passports in the United Kingdom and their transport to St Helena.

Passport statement
St. Helena passports contain on their inside cover the following words in English only:

References

See also 
 Visa requirements for British Overseas Territories Citizens

British passports issued to British Overseas Territories Citizens
Saint Helena, Ascension and Tristan da Cunha law
Saint Helena